Phidiana lottini is a species of sea slug, a nudibranch, a marine, gastropod mollusk in the family Facelinidae.

Distribution
This species was described from Port St Vincent, Talcahuano, Chile, .

References

Facelinidae
Gastropods described in 1831